The World Matchplay was a professional non-ranking snooker tournament established in 1988 and last held in 1992.

History
In 1988 Barry Hearn created an invitational tournament, called the World Matchplay, for the provisional top 12 players, and it ran for five years. The event was held at the Brentwood Centre, Brentwood between 1988 and 1990, before moving to The Dome, Doncaster, for the last two years. The 1988 event was the first snooker tournament to offer a top prize of £100,000.

It was sponsored by Everest in 1988 and 1989, and Coalite from 1990 to 1992. It was televised between 1988 and 1992 by ITV as a replacement for the World Doubles Championship.

Winners

References

 
Recurring sporting events established in 1988
Recurring sporting events disestablished in 1992
1988 establishments in England
1992 disestablishments in England
Snooker competitions in England
Snooker non-ranking competitions
Defunct snooker competitions